Sherman Bardwell (August 17, 1828 – October 23, 1900) was an American merchant and politician.

Born in Allegany County, New York, Bardwell moved to Wisconsin and settled in Plainfield, Wisconsin. Bardwell was a merchant and served in various town offices. In 1873, Bardwell served in the Wisconsin State Assembly and was a Republican. He died in Plainfield, Wisconsin after a long illness.

Notes

1828 births
1900 deaths
People from Allegany County, New York
People from Plainfield, Wisconsin
Businesspeople from Wisconsin
Republican Party members of the Wisconsin State Assembly
19th-century American politicians
19th-century American businesspeople